No Need to Argue is the second studio album by Irish alternative rock band the Cranberries, released on 3 October 1994. It is the band's best selling album, and has sold 17 million copies worldwide as of 2014. It contains the band's most successful single, "Zombie". The album's mood is darker and harsher than that on Everybody Else Is Doing It, So Why Can't We?, released a year before.

Composition
In some of the songs, the band decided to take on a rockier and heavier side, using distortion and increasing the volume. The song "Yeats' Grave"  incorrectly listed on the album as "Yeat's Grave" and never corrected for any of the album's physical re-releases  is about William Butler Yeats, and quotes one of his poems, No Second Troy. The O'Riordan-written track "Zombie" is, according to her, about the Warrington IRA bombings in 1993 that resulted in the death of two children. "The Icicle Melts" a track written by O'Riordan, she states in a 1994 issue of Vox magazine as well as a 1994 Hot Press article   that the song was written about the case of James Bulger and her reaction. O'Riordan also states in the 1994 Hot press article that the original title of the song was "The Liverpool child" a reference to where James Bulger was murdered.

Cover art
For the sleeve design, art director Cally re-enlisted photographer Andy Earl and hired the same sofa that featured on the debut album. The sofa was transported by hand to many locations in and around Dublin including Dalkey Island, coming to rest in a photo studio in Dublin where the white room had been constructed for the cover shot. The band, somewhat influenced by a recent Blur photo, decided to dress up and wear suits. The hand lettering was by Charlotte Villiers, video coordinator at Island Records and distant relative of the Villiers engine manufacturing family.

Each single sleeve featured the band on the sofa in a different location. These images also appeared in the album's booklet. The disc itself featured a photo of just the sofa in the same room. The sofa later appeared in the video for "Alright" by the British band Supergrass in 1995.

Critical reception

Dylan Yadav of Immortal Reviews wrote: "No Need To Argue, their 1994 record that cemented their importance in Irish music". Yadav described that the "rustic upbringing" of O'Riordan's childhood—reflected on "Ode to My Family", "gives credence to the rest of the album and it's personal, grassroots presence". "Yeat's Grave", in "similar fashion" of "Zombie", "is dark and describes those struggles", Yadav opined. He finished the retrospective review by stating that "the Cranberries turned their struggles to art in No Need To Argue, an album that helped bring to light what the culture of Ireland was. Dolores O'Riordan made it all happen with her voice, and that's not to discredit the rest of the band; but that voice is what made the Cranberries stand out amongst the rest. She voiced the struggle of a whole country". In a contemporary review, J. D. Considine wrote that some songs reminded the vocal styles of other artists like "Ridiculous Thoughts" recalling Sinéad O'Connor, "particularly the way O'Riordan handles the phrase 'Twister, aow' and "Zombie" is a bit too much like early Siouxsie and the Banshees". Though Considine positively added, "neither song makes that debt seem especially problematic". The reviewer praised O'Riordan for her performance; "the most memorable thing about her delivery is its unvarnished emotionality". In a retrospective review, AllMusic noted a progression in O'Riordan's way of singing: "No Need to Argue starts to see O'Riordan take a more commanding and self-conscious role", notably on the heavy rock track "Zombie". However, reviewer Ned Raggett stated; "where No Need succeeds best is when the Cranberries stick at what they know, resulting in a number of charmers like "Twenty One," the uilleann pipes-touched "Daffodil's Lament," [...] and the evocative "Disappointment"."

Legacy
On 5 August 1995, Billboard stated that No Need To Argue was the largest seller of albums since its release, with 5.1 million copies sold in six months. On 10 March 1996, the Cranberries won a Juno Awards for Best-Selling Album. In 2009, No Need To Argue was ranked No. 90 on Billboard magazine: "300 Best-Selling Albums of All Time". In July 2014, Guitar World placed No Need to Argue at No. 41 in their "Superunknown: 50 Iconic Albums That Defined 1994" list.

Track listing

Original release

25th Anniversary Edition (2020)

Personnel
The Cranberries
Dolores O'Riordan – vocals, electric and acoustic guitars, keyboards
Noel Hogan – electric and acoustic guitars
Mike Hogan – bass guitar
Fergal Lawler – drums, percussion

Chart positions

Weekly charts

Year-end charts

Certifications and sales

References

1994 albums
The Cranberries albums
Albums produced by Stephen Street
Island Records albums
Juno Award for International Album of the Year albums